Castle Tower is a national park in the Gladstone Region, Queensland, Australia.

Geography 
The vegetation in the park is predominantly open eucalypt woodland. There are also some stands of hoop pine.

Mount Castle Tower can be seen from Lake Awoonga. The park has limited access with permission required from Gladstone Area Water Board to cross their property. There are no facilities for visitors. The elevation of the terrain is 313 meters above sea level. The highest peak in the park is Mount Stanley with 690.9 meters above sea level.

See also

 Boyne Valley, Queensland
 Protected areas of Queensland

References

National parks of Central Queensland
Protected areas established in 1932